Ward Six is a 1978 Yugoslav drama film directed by Lucian Pintilie, an adaptation of Anton Chekhov's short story Ward No. 6. It competed in the Un Certain Regard section at the 1979 Cannes Film Festival.

Cast
 Slobodan Perović as Dr. Andrei Yefimich Rabin
 Zoran Radmilović as Ivan Gromov
 Slavko Simić
 Ljuba Tadić
 Dragomir Čumić
 Dušan Vuisić
 Pavle Vuisić as Nikita
 Stevo Žigon

References

External links
 

1978 films
1978 drama films
Serbo-Croatian-language films
Films directed by Lucian Pintilie
Films based on works by Anton Chekhov
Yugoslav drama films
Films set in Yugoslavia